NGC 1448 or NGC 1457 is an unbarred spiral galaxy seen nearly edge-on in the constellation Horologium. It is at a distance of 55 million light years from Earth. It was discovered by John Herschel in 1835. Five supernovae have been discovered in NGC 1448, SN 1983S (14.5 mag, type II), SN 2001el (14.5 mag, type Ia), SN 2003hn (14.1 mag. type II), SN 2014df (14.0 mag., type Ib) and SN 2021pit (12.3 mag. type Ia). 

From the spectral analysis of SN 2001el, over a dozen diffuse interstellar bands were discovered in NGC 1448 – one of the few cases that these bands were observed outside of the Milky Way. However, the bands were significantly weaker at SN 2003hn.

In January 2017 it was announced that evidence for a supermassive black hole in NGC 1448 had been found in the center of the galaxy.

The galaxy belongs to the NGC 1433 group, part of the Doradus cloud of galaxies.

Gallery

References

External links 

Horologium (constellation)
Unbarred spiral galaxies
1448
13727
Dorado Group